Evelina is a feminine given name. It is either a Latinised variant of Evelyn or an extension of Eva. Notable people with the name include:

People
 Evelina (singer), Finnish singer and songwriter Eveliina Tammenlaakso (born 1995)
 Evelina Borea (born 1931), Italian art historian, author and curator
 Evelina Fernandez, American playwright and actress
 Evelina Haverfield (1867–1920), British suffragette and aid worker
 Evelina Kos (born 1996), Slovenian footballer
 Evi Maltagliati (1908–1986), Italian stage, television and film actress
 Evelina Papantoniou (born 1979), Greek fashion model, actress and 2001 Miss Universe runner-up
 Evelina Papoulia (born 1971), Greek actress and dancer
 Evelina Petrova (born 1974), Russian composer and accordion player
 Evelina Puzaitė (born 1982), Lithuanian classical pianist, composer and writer
 Evelina Raselli (born 1992), Swedish ice hockey player
 Evelina de Rothschild (1839–1866), English socialite
 Evelina Samuelsson (born 1984), Swedish ice hockey player
 Evelina Stading (1803–1829), Swedish landscape painter
 Evelina Tsvetanova (born 1974), Bulgarian former volleyball player
 Evelina Vorontsova (born 1972), Russian/Dutch concert pianist and pedagogue

Fictional characters
 Evelina Anville, title character of the 1778 novel Evelina
 a main character in the 1788 opera Arvire et Évélina

See also
 Evalina, a genus of sea snails
 Eveline (given name)

References

Feminine given names
Greek feminine given names
Italian feminine given names
Lithuanian feminine given names
Swedish feminine given names